The John Hart Dam is one of three hydroelectric dams on the Campbell River, located on Vancouver Island in British Columbia, Canada. The dam is located at the outflow of John Hart Lake. The John Hart Generating Station is located nearby.

Original Generating Station
The BC Power Commission built the first generating station in 1947, it included above ground wood stave penstocks and six turbine-generator units for a total capacity of 126 MW. It was named after John Hart, Premier of BC 1941—1947.

Earthquake Concerns and Upgrades 
By 1979 BC Hydro was concerned about the safety of dams built before 1961. A series of earthquakes since then had shown the susceptibility of some dams to liquefaction. A review begun in 1984 discovered the dam was built on loose, saturate sands and silts. The dam was reinforced using injected grout while under full pool.

Powerhouse Replacement
Due to seismic risks, a 68-year-old facility and lower than optimal power generation, in 2014 contracts were awarded to SNC-Lavalin to design and build a generating station and two new 2 km long, six meter penstocks. The new penstocks and powerhouse are located underground.  The project included the decommissioning of the old facility in conjunction with the construction and commissioning of the new facility.  The 1.1 billion dollar project was completed in 2018. The new powerhouse as a slightly larger capacity at 132.2 megawatts.

See also 
 Elk Falls Provincial Park
 List of generating stations in British Columbia

References 

Mid Vancouver Island
Hydroelectric power stations in British Columbia
Dams in British Columbia
BC Hydro
Publicly owned dams in Canada